Hervé Garel (born 15 July 1967 in Rennes) is a former French former professional road cyclist. He most notably won the Tour de l'Avenir in 1992.

Major results

1990
 1st  Team time trial, National Road Championships
 1st Tour d'Emeraude
1991
 1st  Team time trial, National Road Championships
 1st Overall Tour d'Eure-et-Loir
 1st Grand Prix de France (ITT)
 1st Grand Prix des Nations Amateurs
 1st Paris–Épernay
 1st Créteil–Reims
 1st Stages 3 & 4 Tour of Austria
 1st Stage 5 Ruban Granitier Breton
 3rd Chrono des Herbiers
1992
 1st  Overall Tour de l'Avenir
1st Stage 4
1993
 5th Grand Prix d'Ouverture La Marseillaise
1994
 5th Overall Tour du Limousin

Grand Tour results

References

External links

1967 births
Living people
French male cyclists
Cyclists from Rennes